Thomas Röhler (born 30 September 1991) is a German track and field athlete who competes in the javelin throw. He is the 2016 Olympic Champion and 2018 European Champion. His personal best of 93.90 m for the event ranks him third on the overall list.

Career
Röhler began taking part in track and field as a child in 1998. Raised in Jena, he attended the Johann Christoph Friedrich GutsMuths Sports High school in the city and went on to study at the University of Jena. He first competed mainly as a high jumper and a triple jumper. He began to make his impact as a junior (under-20) athlete in the javelin throw in 2010. That year he threw beyond seventy metres for the first time and represented his country at the 2010 World Junior Championships in Athletics, where he finished in ninth place. The following year he improved to  – a throw which brought him seventh place at the 2011 European Athletics U23 Championships.

He established himself as a senior athlete in 2012. More crucial was his first national title win at the 2012 German Athletics Championships, where he defeated the more experienced Tino Häber. His personal best was not sufficient for entry to the 2012 London Olympics, but he was selected for the 2012 European Athletics Championships. On his senior debut for Germany, he placed 13th in javelin qualifying, equalling the mark of finalist Gabriel Wallin, but missing out due to having a shorter second throw.

The 2013 season saw him achieve his first international medals and he consistently threw beyond eighty metres in competition. At the 2013 European Cup Winter Throwing in March, he was the runner-up behind Latvia's Zigismunds Sirmais. At the end of May, he threw  at a meeting in Dessau – a performance that placed him 16th in the world that season. On his debut on the 2013 IAAF Diamond League circuit, he placed top three at the Bislett Games. He was the silver medallist at the 2013 European Team Championships and retained his national title at the 2013 German Athletics Championships. In a high-quality competition at the 2013 European Athletics U23 Championships, he came third behind Sirmais and German teammate Bernhard Seifert. Röhler was chosen to compete for Germany at the 2013 World Championships in Athletics and on his global senior debut he did not perform well, having his worst competition of the year and failing to better 75 metres. He ended the year with a seventh-place finish at the Memorial Van Damme Diamond League meet.

He and Latvian rival Sirmais repeated their placings at the 2014 European Cup Winter Throwing, the German again finishing second. He improved this further at the Glasgow Grand Prix, throwing the javelin  to take a surprise victory over reigning world champion Vitezslav Vesely.

At the 2016 Summer Olympics in Rio de Janeiro, he won the gold medal with a throw of 90.30 m, narrowly missing the Olympic record of 90.57 m set by Andreas Thorkildsen of Norway during the 2008 Beijing Olympics. At the 2017 IAAF World Championships, he finished fourth with a throw of 88.26 m, six centimetres behind third place.

In July 2018, he won silver at the 2018 German Athletics Championships, with a throw of 88.09 m. In August, he won gold at the 2018 European Athletics Championships with a throw of 89.47 m. He won another gold medal in September, at the 2018 IAAF Continental Cup, with an 87.07 m throw.

At the 2019 World Athletics Championships, Röhler, with a best throw at 79.23 m, did not progress from the qualifying round.

Competition record

Seasonal bests by year

2009 – 52.96
2010 – 76.37
2011 – 78.20
2012 – 80.79
2013 – 83.95
2014 – 87.63
2015 – 89.27
2016 – 91.28
2017 – 93.90
2018 – 91.78
2019 – 86.99

References

External links
 
 
 
 
 
 
 
 

1991 births
Living people
German male javelin throwers
Olympic male javelin throwers
Olympic athletes of Germany
Olympic gold medalists for Germany
Olympic gold medalists in athletics (track and field)
Athletes (track and field) at the 2016 Summer Olympics
Medalists at the 2016 Summer Olympics
World Athletics Championships athletes for Germany
Sportspeople from Jena
European Athletics Championships winners
IAAF Continental Cup winners
Diamond League winners